José Mauro Valente (born July 1, 1969 in Senador Firmino, Minas Gerais) is a retired male middle-distance runner from Brazil.

Personal bests
He set his personal best in the men's 1500 metres event (3:38.07) on May 21, 1994 at a meet in São Paulo.

International competitions

References

External links

1969 births
Living people
Sportspeople from Paraíba
Brazilian male middle-distance runners
Pan American Games athletes for Brazil
Pan American Games gold medalists for Brazil
Pan American Games medalists in athletics (track and field)
Athletes (track and field) at the 1991 Pan American Games
Medalists at the 1991 Pan American Games
21st-century Brazilian people
20th-century Brazilian people